"Lonely Night (Angel Face)" is a song written by Neil Sedaka. The song was first  recorded by Sedaka and appeared as a track on his 1975 studio album, The Hungry Years.
The following year the song was made popular when covered by the pop music duo Captain & Tennille, who took their version to number 3 on the Billboard Hot 100.

Background
In 1976, "Lonely Night (Angel Face)" was a hit single for Captain & Tennille, who had recorded another Sedaka song "Love Will Keep Us Together" a year earlier. Their version of "Lonely Night (Angel Face)" first hit the US Billboard Hot 100 singles chart on January 24, 1976, entering at number 69. It rose to number 3 on the Hot 100 and number 1 on the Billboard Easy Listening chart in March 1976. On the Cashbox chart, it also reached number 1. The song became a Gold record, and Sedaka's biggest hit as a lyricist (aside from this and "That's When the Music Takes Me," Sedaka had generally only written the music to his songs, with Howard Greenfield—from whom Sedaka was estranged at the time—or Phil Cody writing the lyrics).

In Canada the song went to number 1 on the RPM National Top Singles Chart. It hit the pole position on April 17, 1976, and stayed atop the chart for two weeks before bowing out to "Bohemian Rhapsody" by Queen. It was their third of fourteen hit singles.

Reception
Billboard praised the "tight instrumentals."

Chart performance

Weekly charts

Year-end charts

See also
List of number-one adult contemporary singles of 1976 (U.S.)

References

External links
 

1975 songs
1976 singles
Neil Sedaka songs
Captain & Tennille songs
Cashbox number-one singles
RPM Top Singles number-one singles
Songs written by Neil Sedaka
A&M Records singles